Allium korolkowii is a plant species native to Central Asia (Xinjiang, Kazakhstan, and Kyrgyzstan). It grows at elevations of 1500–2500 m.

Allium korolkowii produces egg-shaped bulbs up to 15 mm across. Scape is up to 30 cm high. Leaves are narrow, much shorter than the scape. Flower tepals are white or pink with purple medveins.

References

korolkowii
Onions
Flora of China
Flora of Kyrgyzstan
Flora of Kazakhstan
Flora of Xinjiang
Plants described in 1875